Screamers is a 1995 science fiction horror film starring Peter Weller, Roy Dupuis, and Jennifer Rubin, and directed by Christian Duguay. The screenplay, written by Dan O'Bannon with a rewrite by Miguel Tejada-Flores, is based on Philip K. Dick's 1953 short story "Second Variety", and addresses themes commonly found in that author's work: societal conflict, confusion of reality and illusion, and machines turning upon their creators. The film received generally negative response from critics at the time of its release.  A sequel Screamers: The Hunting, was released in 2009, to mixed reviews.

Plot

In the year 2078, the planet Sirius 6B, once a thriving mining hub, has been reduced to a toxic wasteland by a war between the mining company, known as the New Economic Block (N.E.B.), and "The Alliance", a group of former mining and science personnel. After miners discovered that their extraction of ore released toxic gases, they went on strike, and the mining company hired mercenaries as strike breakers. Five years into the war, Alliance scientists created and deployed Autonomous Mobile Swords (AMS) — artificially intelligent self-replicating machines that hunt down and kill N.E.B. soldiers on their own.  They are nicknamed "screamers" because of a high-pitched noise they emit as they attack.  Screamers track targets by their heartbeats, so Alliance soldiers wear "tabs" which broadcast a signal canceling out the wearer's heartbeat and rendering them "invisible" to the machines.

A fragile stalemate is in effect between the two exhausted, poorly supplied, and undermanned armies.  The Alliance recovers a message from a dead N.E.B. soldier, killed by screamers as he approached the Alliance compound, guaranteeing safe passage through N.E.B. territory to discuss a truce.  When Alliance commanding officer Joe Hendricksson reports this development to his Earth-based superiors, he is told that peace negotiations are already underway on Earth; but Private "Ace" Jefferson, newly arrived from Earth, says that is untrue.  Hendricksson is not surprised; he has long suspected that both sides have simply written off Sirius 6B and abandoned their armies.

Hendricksson decides that the only realistic chance of survival for himself and his soldiers is to accept the N.E.B. truce offer.  He sets out for a meeting with the N.E.B. commander, accompanied by Jefferson. While traveling through a destroyed city they come upon a war orphan, a young boy named David, clutching a teddy bear.  Unwilling to abandon a defenseless civilian, they bring the boy along.  The following night they are attacked by a reptilian screamer that they have never before encountered.  Hendricksson is alarmed that their Alliance tabs did not protect them.

As the group nears the N.E.B. compound, two enemy soldiers, Becker and Ross, open fire on David, whose chest explodes in a shower of gears, bolts, and wires.  They explain to the astonished Alliance men that David was a new "type 3" screamer impersonating a human.  Most of the N.E.B. contingent has been wiped out by another "David" screamer that a patrol unwittingly brought into the base; Becker, Ross, and a black marketeer named Jessica are the only survivors.

The group heads to the N.E.B. command center but finds only an empty building and large pools of blood. Locating the mainframe computer, Hendricksson learns that the N.E.B. truce offer was just as false as the Alliance message from Earth. The group retreats to the N.E.B. bunker, pursued by "Davids".  The discovery that the screamers have "evolved" new versions on their own that are  indistinguishable from humans, and immune to Alliance tabs, leads to paranoia and distrust.  Becker becomes convinced that Ross is a screamer and kills him, only to discover that he was human.  The four survivors retreat to the Alliance base, only to find that the "Davids" have gained entrance to that compound as well, with equally devastating results.  As dozens of "Davids" pour out of the bunker's entrance, Hendricksson fires a micro-nuclear missile into the bunker.  Jefferson rushes to the aid of Becker, who was apparently injured in the blast, but Becker's cries of distress are a ruse; he is a "type 2" screamer, and he kills Jefferson. After Hendricksson destroys Becker, only he and Jessica remain.

Now paranoid, Hendricksson worries that Jessica could be a screamer as well.  He slashes her hand, and is relieved to see blood dripping from the wound. They locate an emergency escape shuttle.  As they prepare it for launch, they are attacked by another "Becker" that Hendricksson destroys. With the shuttle now prepared, they discover it can carry only one person. Hendricksson offers the shuttle to Jessica; but a second "Jessica" arrives, confirming that she is a screamer after all, and even more human-like.  Hendricksson resigns himself to death; but to his surprise, Jessica shields him, then sacrifices herself in battle with her lookalike.  With her last breath, Jessica confesses her love for Hendricksson.

Hendricksson departs for Earth on the escape shuttle with a single souvenir, the teddy bear carried by the original "David".  As the screen fades to black, the bear slowly begins to move on its own.

Cast
 Peter Weller as Commander Joseph A. Hendricksson 
 Jennifer Rubin as Jessica Hansen Screamer
 Andrew Lauer as Private Michael "Ace" Jefferson 
 Ron White as Lieutenant Commander Chuck Elbarak
 Charles Powell as Private Ross 
 Roy Dupuis as Marshal Richard Cooper / Private Becker Screamer 
 Michael Caloz as David Screamer 
 Liliana Komorowska as Private Landowska
 Jason Cavalier as Private Leone
 Leni Parker as Corporal McDonald
 Bruce Boa as Secretary Green

Release
It premiered at the 1995 Toronto International Film Festival on September 8, 1995. It was released in the United States on January 26, 1996, by Columbia Pictures.

Production
Screamers was stuck in development hell for over a decade before finally being produced. Screenwriter Dan O'Bannon had completed his adaptation of Dick's short story Second Variety in 1981 (along with his adaptation of another of Dick's short stories, We Can Remember It For You Wholesale, which became the 1990 film Total Recall). By 1983, O'Bannon's screenplay for Screamers had been optioned by Tom Naud (SFX designer on the 1981 film Outland). However, the production never went ahead as planned. At various times, Charles Fries showed interest in the project, but it was not until the 1990s that Screamers went into production. By this time the screenplay had been rewritten by Miguel Tejada-Flores. O'Bannon was unaware that the film had been made until after its release, when his agent called him to notify him of his screenwriting credit for the film. According to O'Bannon, they had kept much of the plot and characters from his original script the same while changing much of the dialogue.

The film, directed by Christian Duguay, was made in Canada. Locations included a quarry in Quebec, in Montreal's Olympic Stadium, as well as Joliette.

Reception

Critical response  
The film holds a 29% approval rating on Rotten Tomatoes based on 35 reviews.

James Berardinelli gave the film a positive review, awarding it a rating of three stars (out of four). Berardinelli said that the film "oozes atmosphere" and "underlines an important truth: you don't need a big budget or big-name stars to make this sort of motion picture succeed."
Joe Bob Briggs also reacted positively, calling Screamers "a pretty dang decent [movie]" and saying, "I loved it. ... Three and a half stars."

Roger Ebert gave the film two and a half stars (out of four), remarking that it was "made with a certain imagination and intelligence," "the dialogue is often effective," and "what makes the film somewhat intriguing is its Blade Runner-like ambiguity: who is, and who isn't, a human being."

Time Out New York Film Guide criticized director Christian Duguay's "flashy, aimless direction", saying that the movie "lacks the intelligence to follow through its grim premise", but added that the film "does offer many ... guilty pleasures" and "the design and effects teams have lent scale and impact to the futuristic locations and sets."

The Science Fiction, Horror, and Fantasy Film Review gave Screamers three stars out of four, calling it a "two-thirds excellent and intelligent science-fiction film" that "builds towards a climax that never arrives ... After an impressive build-up, the film blows its third act and falls into cliches."
Popcorn Pictures gave the film two and a half stars out of four, writing: "Screamers isn't terrible. The scenes inside the refinery are creepy enough with them stalking and being stalked by the Screamers. But the intro and finale are terrible ways to start and end a film respectively. There was a good film waiting to come out here, it's a shame only half of it did."

Rob Blackwelder of SplicedWire said, "Screamers is inundated with movie clichés, stock characters, stolen premises and scenes that just don't make sense."
Beyond Hollywood wrote, "One of the biggest problems with Screamers is the near absence of a likeable character, or at least someone who we actually give a damn about escaping those slice-and-dice robots. ... There's no doubt Screamers could have been a lot better than it is. The whole sequence at the refinery is the best of the movie, managing to elicit both a couple of scare scenes and a lot of creepiness. The rest, unfortunately, doesn't live up to that middle section."

Box office
The film earned about $5.7 million in the United States and Canada, on a $20 million budget. It was moderately popular in France, Japan, and the Netherlands. Worldwide box office was approximately $7 million.

Awards

Sequel

Screamers: The Hunting, directed by Sheldon Wilson and starring Gina Holden, Jana Pallaske, Greg Bryk, Stephen Amell and Lance Henriksen, was released straight to DVD in 2009.

The sequel is set several years after the events of the original film.  Hendricksson died when he deliberately allowed his escape shuttle to burn up in the atmosphere during reentry to Earth. The official determination is that he committed suicide due to post-traumatic stress; but it is strongly implied that he actually did it to prevent the "teddy bear" screamer on board from reaching Earth.  Meanwhile, an SOS signal arrives from Sirius 6B.  A contingent of seven soldiers, including Hendricksson's daughter Victoria Bronte (Holden), is dispatched to the war torn mining planet to investigate.  The film features all of the screamers from the original film, as well as a sleeker, longer, and more serpentine screamer with cutting mandibles for a mouth.

As with Screamers, critical reaction to Screamers: The Hunting was mixed. David Johnson of DVD Verdict wrote that "the visual effects were surprisingly effective" and "[p]ractical effects impress as well", but added, "Unfortunately ... the script defaults to a clichéd finale, and a predictable—though well-executed—final twist ending."  He concluded, "I had a pretty decent time with [Screamers: The Hunting] ... [I]f you're hankering for a serving of effective sci-fi B-movie shenanigans, you could do a lot worse."
Scott Foy of Dread Central wrote, "They've basically recycled the first film but dumbed it and dulled it down considerably, doing away with the paranoia and sense of desolation that gave the original some spark in favor of logic gaps and tedious predictability. ... The best that can be said ... is that most of the production values and make-up effects are top notch for a direct-to-DVD production. Too bad they didn't put as much work into crafting the screenplay."

See also
 Grey goo scenario
 Self-reconfiguring modular robot
 Self-replicating machine

References

External links

 

 

1995 films
1990s science fiction action films
1990s science fiction horror films
English-language Canadian films
Canadian war films
Canadian science fiction action films
Canadian science fiction thriller films
American science fiction thriller films
American robot films
American science fiction action films
American war films
1990s English-language films
American dystopian films
Films based on short fiction
Films based on science fiction short stories
Films based on works by Philip K. Dick
Films directed by Christian Duguay (director)
Films scored by Normand Corbeil
Films set in the 2070s
Films set on fictional planets
Films shot in Montreal
American post-apocalyptic films
Quebec films
Space adventure films
Films using stop-motion animation
Triumph Films films
Films set in 2078
Films with screenplays by Dan O'Bannon
Canadian post-apocalyptic films
1990s American films
1990s Canadian films
Films set in bunkers